Megachile ardens is a species of bee in the family Megachilidae. It was described by Smith in 1897.

References

Ardens
Insects described in 1897